Eleuthemis buettikoferi, the firebelly, is a species of dragonfly in the family Libellulidae. It is the only species in its genus.

It is found in Angola, Cameroon, Central African Republic, the Democratic Republic of the Congo, Ivory Coast, Equatorial Guinea, Gabon, Ghana, Guinea, Liberia, Mozambique, Nigeria, Sierra Leone, Tanzania, Togo, Uganda, Zambia, and Zimbabwe. Its natural habitats are subtropical or tropical moist lowland forests, subtropical or tropical dry shrubland, subtropical or tropical moist shrubland, and rivers.

References

 Clausnitzer, V. 2005.  Eleuthemis buettikoferi.   2006 IUCN Red List of Threatened Species.   Downloaded on 9 August 2007.

Libellulidae
Taxa named by Friedrich Ris
Taxonomy articles created by Polbot
Insects described in 1910